Charles Holme (1848–1923) was an English journalist and art critic, founding editor of The Studio from 1893. He published a series of books promoting peasant art in the first decades of the 20th century.

Life
Holme was born on 7 October 1848 in Derby, the younger son of a silk manufacturer, George Holme, and his wife Ann, née Brentnall.
 Holme himself worked in the silk and wool trades, trading with Turkestan, India and China in the 1870s. He subsequently opened offices in Japan, visiting the country in 1889 with the painter Alfred East and Arthur Lasenby Liberty and his wife. He served as vice-president of the Japan Society, and was a recipient of the Order of the Rising Sun in 1902. Holme was a member of the private bibliophile club, the Sette of Odd Volumes, and President in 1890. Holme was painted by Philip Alexius de László in 1908; the portrait was published in The Studio in 1911.

He died on 14 March 1923 in Upton Grey, Hampshire.

The Studio

Following his retirement from trade in 1892, Holme founded The Studio: an illustrated magazine of fine and applied art, a magazine dedicated to fine arts and decorative arts, giving roughly equal weight to each. The first issue appeared in April 1893. The first serving editor was Joseph Gleeson White (Lewis Hind had acted as editor for four months before the launch of the magazine). In 1895 Holme took over as editor himself, although Gleeson White continued to contribute. Holme retired as editor in 1919 for reasons of health, and was succeeded by his son Charles Geoffrey Holme, who was already the editor of special numbers and year-books of the magazine.

Edited works

Special numbers of The Studio were edited by Holme for separate publication as books.

 Corot and Millet; with critical essays by Gustave Geffroy & Arsène Alexandre, 1902
 Daumier and Gavarni by Henri Frantz and Octave Uzanne, 1904
 Peasant art in Italy by S. J. A. Churchill, V. Balzano and Elisa Ricci, 1905
 The gardens of England in the southern & western counties, 1907
 Art in England during the Elizabethan and Stuart periods by Aymer Vallance, 1908
 Old English mezzotints by Malcolm Salaman, 1910
 Peasant art in Sweden, Lapland and Iceland by Sten Granlund and Jarno Jessen (pseud.), 1910
 Peasant art in Austria and Hungary by A. S. Levetus, Dr. Haberlandt and Aladár Körösfői-Kriesch, 1911
 Peasant art in Russia, 1912
 Old houses in Holland by Sydney R. Jones, 1913
 The great painter-etchers from Rembrandt to Whistler by Malcolm Salaman, 1914
 The art of the book; a review of some recent European and American work in typography, page decoration & binding, 1914
 Shakespeare in pictorial art by Malcolm Salaman, 1916
 The development of British landscape painting in water-colours by Alexander Joseph Finberg and E. A. Taylor, 1918.

References

Further reading
 The Diary of Charles Holme's 1889 Visit to Japan and North America, edited by Toni Huberman, Sonia Ashmore and Yasuko Suga. Kent: Global Oriental, 2008

1848 births
1923 deaths
English male journalists
English art critics
People from Derby